Melvin Jenkins (born March 16, 1962) is a former professional American football player who played cornerback for seven seasons for the Seattle Seahawks, Detroit Lions, and Atlanta Falcons. He also played in the Canadian Football League for the Calgary Stampeders.

1962 births
Living people
Players of American football from Jackson, Mississippi
Players of Canadian football from Jackson, Mississippi
American football cornerbacks
Canadian football defensive backs
American players of Canadian football
Calgary Stampeders players
Seattle Seahawks players
Detroit Lions players
Atlanta Falcons players
Cincinnati Bearcats football players
Hinds Eagles football players